Pomor trade (from ; po «by» and more «ocean»; «area by the ocean», the same word is the basis for Pomerania), is the trade carried out between the Pomors of Northwest Russia and the people along the coast of Northern Norway, as far south as Bodø. The trade went on from 1740 until the Russian revolution in 1917.

The pomor trade began as a barter trade between people in the area, trading grain products from Russia with fish from North Norway as the main trade. With time it developed into a regular trade against money: in fact the ruble was used as currency in several places in North Norway. The pomor trade was of major importance both to Russians and Norwegians. The trade was carried out by Russian pomors from the White Sea area and the Kola peninsula who came sailing to settlements and places of trade along the coast of North Norway. The pomors were skilled traders and sailors, and they did also explore the areas around the White sea. In addition to their trade westwards, they established a trade route east across the Ural mountains to North Siberia.

Trade between the countries since the Viking Age
Trade between Russians and people in North Norway has a long history, dating at least back to the Viking Age. The Russians traded, through the principality in Novgorod, with the Sami people in North Norway from the Middle Ages until the beginning of the 17th century. In early summer, the catch from the winter- and spring fisheries in North Norway were bought and shipped south to Trondheim and Bergen by traders, mainly stockfish, and unsalted dried cod. 

The six weeks from 10 July to 20 August was referred to as "maggot time", because the fish was difficult to conserve in summer, and there was no market southwards for the fish. The Russians recognized this opportunity. They sailed west in the "maggot time" and bought fish, either readily prepared stockfish or salt fish, or they salted the fish themselves in the cargo hold of their vessels. Fish was in demand in Russia due to the Russian Church's frequent fasting days, when only fish and vegetarian food was allowed. The fish was shipped to Arkangelsk, which also was port of shipment for grain products being carried to North Norway. In addition to the vessels from Arkangelsk, pomor trade was carried out by vessels from other harbours along the White Sea such as Kem and Onega, and also from smaller places such as Suma, Kolisma, Solotiza, Mudjunga, Saroka and Sjuja.

From 1740 the pomor trade spread in North Norway, and from ca 1770 the pomors came annually with cheap rye flour (referred to as "Russian flour" in Norway), but also wheat flour. The grain was grown inland around the river Volga and transported to traders along the White Sea. In North Norway, the pomor trade were in periods essential for survival. In the 18th century there were several crop failures and generally bad times in Norway. For instance, the price of rye in Bergen increased fivefold in 30 years. Thus, the pomor trade proved an important factor for food supply. Fishermen could buy cheap grains and flour, and could sell the catch from the summer fisheries for a good price. It was possible to haggle with the pomors, the trade had no middlemen to drive up prices, and no taxes or customs fees were paid to Norway for the merchandise. In addition to rye and wheat flour, the pomors carried other food, such as oatmeal, salt, peas, meat and dairy products. Other useful merchandise were also carried, such as iron, timber, tar, birch bark, candles, cooking pots, hemp, rope and canvas. They also brought some luxury items such as candy, soap, porcelain and wood carvings. On their way home the pomors loaded their ships with fish of various sorts, mainly Atlantic cod and dry saithe (pollock Pollachius virens), but also Atlantic halibut and haddock.

Regulating the pomor trade 

King Haakon V of Norway prohibited foreigners from trading in North Norway as early as 1316. Until the reformation in 1537 the trade between North Norway and the Hanseatic league in Bergen was controlled by the archbishop in Trondheim. In the middle of the 16th century the privileges of trade was handed over to citizens in Bergen and Trondheim, giving them a monopoly. There are reports of Russians trading illegally in North Norway from the late 17th century. Norwegians trading with Russians could be punished by being denied winter supplies from the (Norwegian) traders. The trade monopoly was lifted in 1715. Later in the 18th century, the trade was placed under control of the king and trade houses of Copenhagen. In 1783 the government in Copenhagen decided that it should be arranged for pomor trade with traders in Finnmark, and that North Norway should be supplied with grain and other merchandise from Russia instead of from Denmark.

The trade monopoly was abolished and free trade were introduced in 1789. Vardø and Hammerfest in Finnmark were given town status, and the merchants there gained trade privileges. Vardø grew to be the most important town in Norway regarding the pomor trade. The harbour in Vardø could at times have 100 Russian vessels moored simultaneously, and also had a Russian consulate. Tromsø gained town status and trade privileges in 1794, and was given a monopoly for trading with the pomors in Troms. In the early 19th century, the pomor trade was legalized south to Lofoten. Direct trading with the fishermen were illegal; the pomor trade was reserved for the merchants. This new situation meant a restriction for the fishermen, as until 1789 the Norwegian government had more or less looked away regarding fishermen trading directly with the pomors, but now this became difficult. In 1796, fishermen in Finnmark were allowed to trade directly, but only for one month in the "maggot time". Several merchants in Troms were allowed to trade with the pomors in 1818, and in 1839 the fishermen in Troms could trade directly, but only at four locations in Troms county. In addition, fishermen in Lofoten and Vesterålen were allowed to trade directly.

During the Gunboat War in the early 19th century, the United Kingdom introduced a trade embargo against Denmark-Norway. In this period, the pomor trade proved vital for North Norway. A decree legalising direct trade between fishermen and pomors during the Napoleonic Wars was issued in 1809. Several Russian vessels were seized by the Royal Navy, and thus many vessels did not sail any further than East Finnmark. Then in 1809, during the Anglo-Russian War, the British government established a blockade along Norway's coast in the years, amongst other things to stop the pomor trade and cut the supply lines of goods from Arkangelsk. The White Sea was closed, but quite a few Russian vessels managed to slip through. The Norwegian response to the blockade was to fortify important harbours such as Hammerfest and in 1810 the Norwegians established a special naval squadron, the "Finnmarkseskadren" or "The Finnmark squadron", to protect the pomor trade.

Golden age and discontinuance 

Later in the 19th century, North Norway experienced an economic recovery, with better communications south, especially thanks to a coastal steamship route. North Norway's need for grain imports declined. Yet the pomor trade increased, reaching its golden age in the last years of the 19th century. Trade privileges were lifted around 1870, and the trade period was extended. In 1874 the trade was between 15 June and 30 September, which by and large is when the White Sea is ice-free. An important reason for the increase in trade was the legalisation of trade directly with the fishermen. The amount of trade places were also increased.

The Pomors modernized their vessels in this period. The 'lodje' (Norwegian word) disappeared in the 1880s, and schooners, jekter and galeases were used. The Solovetsky Monastery of the Solovetsky Islands in the White Sea was the religious centre of the Pomors. The monastery possessed large properties around the White Sea, and amongst its activities were boat-building, a saltworks, and fisheries. It owned several steamers participating in the Pomor trade in the early 20th century. 

In 1870, 400 Russian pomor vessels visited Tromsø. Normally, over 300 pomor vessels with a crew of around 2000 visited North Norway annually. In 1900, Russia was Norway's fourth most important trade partner, and rye flour remained the main commodity. After 1910, less flour was traded, the Russians paid for the fish with money instead. During World War I Russian export regulations were changed, and fear of German submarine attacks limited the Pomor trade. After the Russian revolution in 1917, the pomor trade was ceased. This had negative effects on the economy in North Norway, specially for the settlements along the coast. The fishermen no longer had a possibility to sell their summer catch. Still, the occasional pomor vessel came to Norway after the trade was officially terminated. The last one came in 1929, when Joseph Stalin's collectivisation came into full effect, ending private property rights and persecuting merchants.

More than trade connections

Beginning in the 1830s, a pidgin language began taking form between Norwegians and Russians, Russenorsk. A lack of metalinguistic awareness amongst Russenorsk speakers may have led them to believe they were speaking the language of their interlocutor; that is, that Russians believed they were speaking Norwegian and vice versa. As Norwegian merchants began sending their children to school in Arkhangelsk, Russenorsk lost some of its standing.

Many of the large trade places along the coast and in the fjords of North Norway that sprung up in the 19th century were based upon the pomor trade. The trade led to other relations, for instance did the Russians start a regular steamship service from Arkhangelsk to Vardø in 1875. This service paved the ground for Russian tourism and seasonal workers in Finnmark. The people of North Norway got an insight of a different culture: Drinking tea brewed on a samovar, part-singing, the colourful clothes of the Russian women and the hospitality of the pomor skippers cabin. Often, the vessels visited the same place year after year, and the Norwegians got to know the skipper and crew. The Russians and the trade with them had high esteem in North Norway, they were known for being trustworthy.

Literature
Per Botolf Maurseth Historiske handelsstrømmer mellom Norge og Russland : betydningen av pomorhandelen fram mot første verdenskrig. I: Historisk tidsskrift 1997
Einar Niemi. Pomor, Norge og Russland i nord. I: P2-akademiet. E (NRK, 1996)
Einar Niemi (red.) Pomor : Nord-Norge og Nord-Russland gjennom tusen år (Gyldendal, 1992)
Ottar, nr 4, 1992 (temanummer)

Anastasia Gorter-Grønvik. Ter-Kysten. I: "Nordnorsk magasin", nr 3/4 (1998)
Anastasia Gorter-Grønvik. Til de gamle pomorbyene i 1990-åra. Article series in "Nordnorsk magasin", nr 1 (1994) - nr 8 (1993) - nr 6/7 (1993) og nr 5 (1993)

Notes

External links
The Pomor Museum in Vardø
Historien om Norge i nord by Ivan Kristoffersen, 2003. [Odin.no]
«Nordlysveien: Pomorhandelen», Universitetsbiblioteket i Tromsø, 2001
Håvard Dahl Bratrein: «Karlsøy og Helgøy bygdebok», 1989

References

Economy of the Russian Empire
Trade
Economic history of Norway
1740 establishments in Europe
1740s establishments in Norway
1917 disestablishments in Norway
History of Finnmark
History of Murmansk Oblast
History of the Arctic
Norway–Russia relations
Sámi history